Darryl Lynn Hughley (born March 6, 1963) is an American actor and stand-up comedian. Hughley is best known as the original host of BET's ComicView from 1992 to 1993, the eponymous character on the ABC/UPN sitcom The Hughleys, and as one of the "Big Four" comedians in The Original Kings of Comedy. Additionally, he has been the host of CNN's D. L. Hughley Breaks the News, a correspondent for The Jay Leno Show on NBC, and a local radio personality and interviewer in New York City. In early 2013, D.L. Hughley landed in 9th place on Dancing with the Stars.

Early life 
Hughley was born in Portsmouth, VA, the son of Audrey and Charles Hughley, who was a Delta Air Lines maintenance worker. He is the second of four children. He stayed in Portsmouth for only two months before his family moved, Hughley grew up in South Central Los Angeles. Hughley's teen years were troubled as he became a member of the notorious street gang, the Bloods, and was expelled from San Pedro High School. However, he eventually turned his back on gang life, got his GED, and obtained employment with the Los Angeles Times.

Career 
From 1992 to 1993, Hughley was the original host of ComicView, the stand-up comedy program on BET. In 1993, he also appeared in the third season of Fresh Prince of Bel Air as Will's friend Keith Campbell, a comedian from Philadelphia. From 1998 to 2002, he wrote, produced and starred in the television sitcom series, The Hughleys, based on his real-life experiences living with his African-American family in an upscale neighborhood. During 2005, he released a stand-up comedy album "D.L. Hughley: Notes From The GED Section" and had a short-lived talk show on Comedy Central called Weekends at the D.L. He is a member of The Original Kings of Comedy, and has also had roles on Studio 60 on the Sunset Strip, and on NBC's Scrubs as Turk's brother. In 2008, he was the host of the BET Awards.  He also attended the funeral of one of his best friends and fellow King of Comedy, Bernie Mac where he gave a tearful speech during the eulogy.

In June 2010, Hughley served as special guest moderator of ABC's The View for one day.

Hughley guest-starred on TBS's Glory Daze and guest hosted Who Wants to Be a Millionaire

Hughley's first book, I Want You to Shut the F#ck Up: How the Audacity of Dopes Is Ruining America, with contributions from Michael Malice, was published on July 31, 2012, by Crown Archetype Press.

Hughley was a contestant on season 16 of Dancing with the Stars. He was partnered with two-time champion Cheryl Burke.

Hughley's second book, Black Man, White House: An Oral History of the Obama Years, was published on June 6, 2017, by William Morrow.

Hughley's third book, How Not to Get Shot: And Other Advice From White People with contributions from Doug Moe was published on June 26, 2018, by William Morrow.

Hughley's fourth book, Surrender, White People: Our Unconditional Terms for Peace with contributions from Doug Moe was published on June 30, 2020, by HarperCollins.

Hughley's latest book, How to Survive America, was published June 15, 2021, with contributions from Doug Moe was published on June 15, 2021, by Custom House.

He is now hosting a talk show The D.L. Hughley Show, that premiered on TV One on March 18, 2019.

CNN 

Hughley was selected to host and write a comedic news-show on CNN which covers global happenings in politics, entertainment, sports and pop culture, titled D. L. Hughley Breaks the News, which aired its premiere episode on Saturday, October 25, 2008, at 10 p.m. EDT on CNN.
On March 9, 2009, CNN announced Hughley would be ending the show due to a desire to work in Los Angeles and be closer to his family.  He planned to continue his work with CNN as a Los Angeles-based contributor for the network.

Radio 
Hughley also has a career as an on-air radio personality.  On July 20, 2009, The D.L. Hughley Morning Show premiered on WRKS (now WEPN), more popularly known at the time as 98.7 Kiss FM, an urban adult contemporary station in New York City.  His co-hosts included former BET news correspondent Jacque Reid.  Airing from 6 to 10 am, the show placed Hughley in direct competition with his fellow "King of Comedy" Steve Harvey, whose nationally syndicated Steve Harvey Morning Show airs in New York on WBLS (Kiss FM's longtime rival).  There were plans to take Hughley's show into syndication as well, but a dispute regarding his salary erupted between Kiss FM's parent company and the potential syndication company.  In August 2010, Kiss FM dropped the show from its schedule, and Hughley moved on to other endeavors.

On August 12, 2013, REACH Media, the syndicator founded by Tom Joyner, announced it had finalized a deal with D.L. to host a new nationally syndicated afternoon drive show, The D.L. Hughley Show, distributed by Cumulus Media Networks.

Personal life 
Hughley and his wife, LaDonna, have two daughters, Ryan and Tyler, and a son, Kyle. Hughley has discussed his son's Asperger syndrome on several occasions.

On November 9, 2017, Hughley gave an interview on Angela Yee's Lipservice podcast in which he described having an affair early in his marriage and career. His mistress had become pregnant and had a son; the infant was shaken to death by the infant's mother's boyfriend.

On June 19, 2020, Hughley collapsed while performing at a club in Nashville, Tennessee; the reported cause was exhaustion. Subsequent tests revealed he was positive for COVID-19.

Hughley was initiated as an honorary member of Omega Psi Phi fraternity on July 30, 2020.

Filmography

Film

Television

References

External links 

D.L Hughley – Official website of D.L Hughley
The D.L. Hughley Show
 D.L. Hughley at the Comedy Hall of Fame
 

1963 births
Male actors from Los Angeles
American male film actors
African-American male actors
African-American television producers
Television producers from California
African-American stand-up comedians
African-American television talk show hosts
American television talk show hosts
Living people
American male voice actors
American stand-up comedians
American male television actors
CNN people
Former gang members
Comedians from California
Film producers from California
21st-century American comedians
21st-century African-American people
20th-century African-American people